Sand Springs is an unincorporated community and census-designated place in Howard County, Texas, United States. Its population was 835 at the 2010 census. Interstate 20 passes through the community.

Geography

References

Unincorporated communities in Howard County, Texas
Unincorporated communities in Texas
Census-designated places in Howard County, Texas
Census-designated places in Texas